James Darmesteter (28 March 184919 October 1894) was a French author, orientalist, and antiquarian.

Biography
He was born of Jewish parents at Château-Salins, in Lorraine. The family name had originated in their earlier home of Darmstadt. He was educated in Paris, where, under the guidance of Michel Bréal and Abel Bergaigne, he imbibed a love for Oriental studies, to which for a time he entirely devoted himself. In 1875, he published a thesis on the mythology of the Avesta, in which he advocated that the Persian religion of Zoroastrianism had been influenced by Judaism (and not backwards as many scholars say). In 1877 became teacher of Persian language at the École des Hautes Études. He continued his research with his Études iraniennes (1883), and ten years later published a complete translation of the Avesta and associated Zend (lit. "commentary"), with historical and philological commentary of his own (Zend Avesta, 3 vols., 1892–1893) in the Annales du Musée Guimet. He also edited the Avesta for Max Müller's Sacred Books of the East series (vols. 4 and 23).

Darmesteter regarded the extant texts as far more recent than commonly believed, placing the earliest in the 1st century BC and the bulk in the 3rd century AD. In 1885 he was appointed professor in the Collège de France, and was sent to India in 1886 on a mission to collect the popular songs of the Afghans, a translation of which, with a valuable essay on the Afghan language and literature, he published on his return. His impressions of English dominion in India were conveyed in Lettres sur l'Inde (1888). England interested him deeply; and his attachment to the gifted English writer, Agnes Mary Frances Robinson, whom he shortly afterwards married (and who in 1901 became the wife of Professor E. Duclaux, director of the Pasteur Institute at Paris), led him to translate her poems into French in 1888. Two years after his death a collection of excellent essays on English subjects was published in English.  He also wrote Le Mahdi depuis les origines de l'Islam jusqu'a nos jours (1885); Les Origines de la poesie persane (1888); Prophètes d'Israel (1892), and other books on topics connected with the East, and from 1883 onwards drew up the annual reports of the Société Asiatique. He had just become connected with the Revue de Paris, when his delicate constitution succumbed to a slight attack of illness on 10 October 1894 at Maisons-Laffitte.

His elder brother, Arsène Darmesteter, was a distinguished philologist and man of letters.

There is an éloge of James Darmesteter in the Journal asiatique (1894, vol. iv., pp. 519–534), and a notice by Henri Cordier, with a list of his writings, in The Royal Asiatic Society's Journal (January 1895); see also Gaston Paris, "James Darmesteter," in Penseurs et poètes (1896), (pp. 1–61).

References

External links

 
 
 
 Mary Boyce and D. N. MacKenzie, Encyclopaedia Iranica: https://iranicaonline.org/articles/darmesteter

1849 births
1894 deaths
People from Moselle (department)
19th-century French Jews
French orientalists
Linguists from France
French Iranologists
Translators from Avestan
19th-century translators
19th-century French historians